New Thacker was an unincorporated community and coal town located in Mingo County, West Virginia, United States. Their Post Office  has been closed.

The community most likely took its name from nearby Thacker Creek.

References 

Unincorporated communities in West Virginia
Unincorporated communities in Mingo County, West Virginia
Coal towns in West Virginia